Cannon Hill is a small district of the London Borough of Merton

Location
It can be considered to occupy a south-east corner of Raynes Park or be a continuation of that suburb.

Economic dependence
Raynes Park in turn hosts many of the local amenities on which it depends, such as schools and shops.

A much broader economic hub, including entertainment and restaurants figures in Wimbledon, the main commercial hub of the borough  to the north-east.

Characteristics
It is a small Outer London style neighbourhood, specifically, of low population density for its distance from London's centre and in the semi-green west of the Borough.  It consists mostly of 1920s/30s terraced, semi-detached and a little detached housing set back slightly from spacious streets and urban avenues. It has fairly high statistics of car ownership per head. Many of its houses are in or possess conservation area characteristics and/or features, including Dutch gables, high ceilings, spacious bay windows and other embellishments and additions which enhance domestic life.  The post-war housing, generally in small schemes in Cannon Hill, has some of the better examples of spacious plots and such architectural elements, following the era of relatively modest wages, even among the intended middle class purchasers and occupiers, of interwar Britain.

Transport

Public transport includes a number of bus routes skirting its narrow boundaries or within the district.

A railway station at Cannon Hill was planned in the 1920s, but when the line was constructed the station was omitted. Nearby Raynes Park railway station has 12 trains or more per hour in each direction, including a service to and from London Waterloo station.

References

Areas of London
Districts of the London Borough of Merton